Leland (Lee) Hansen, (born on March 26, 1944, in Spokane, Washington) is an American radio personality and voice actor best known for creating the popular Alien Worlds radio drama in the late 1970s.

Background
Hansen grew up on a farm in Tekoa, Washington and began his radio career at KCLX while still attending Tekoa High School. After graduation he went to South Vietnam to serve in the Vietnam War, and in 1963 he became a founding member of Armed Forces Radio Saigon (AFRS). The radio network would eventually spread and serve over 500,000 GI's, and Hansen hosted the station's very first morning show in Saigon.

After his discharge, Hansen worked as a disc jockey for major Top 40 radio stations around the country, until he was hired in 1970 by Mel Blanc Audio Media. He served as both their Creative Director and Studio Operations Manager, and a year later he was appointed Director of The Mel Blanc School of Voice and Commercials.

He joined Watermark Studios in 1973. He became studio manager and worked as a producer and co-producer for several syndicated radio shows. Also at Watermark, in 1977 he became best known for creating, producing, and directing the popular dramatic radio series Alien Worlds – On The Threshold of The Unknown. The stories were written by Hansen and Ron Thompson with a variety of other co-writers including Babylon 5 writer J. Michael Straczynski. The science fiction drama was eventually picked up by more than 1500 stations worldwide.

Later career
Alien Worlds ended in 1980 and he went on to UCLA Film School. He later gained prominence with his production company “GDE” as a writer, producer and director for film and TV features centered around the US Space Program and Aerospace Industry. Hansen is currently the CEO of Addlink, LLC, a Hollywood production firm.

Radio work

As a DJ
 KCLX in Colfax, Washington
 AFRS in Saigon, Vietnam
 WGBA in Columbus, Georgia
 WQXI in Atlanta, Georgia
 KASH in Eugene, Oregon
 KENO/KLUC-FM in Las Vegas, Nevada
 KUTE FM in Los Angeles, California

As a producer
American Top 40 with Casey Kasem
 American Country Countdown with Bob Kingsley
 The Robert W. Morgan Special of The Week
 The Elvis Presley Story
 Soundtrack of the '60s with Gary Owens
 Alien Worlds with Linda Gary
 The Rock Files with Keith Austin

Further reading
 Straczynski, J. Michael. "The Complete Book of Scriptwriting." Writers Digest Books, 1996. .
 "Who's Who In Entertainment." Marquis Who's Who, 1990. .

References

External links
Alien Worlds official website

American radio DJs
American radio producers
American male screenwriters
American Top 40
American male voice actors
Male actors from Spokane, Washington
Living people
1944 births
Screenwriters from Washington (state)
People from Tekoa, Washington